Lashford Lane Fen is a   nature reserve north of Dry Sandford in Oxfordshire. It is managed by the Berkshire, Buckinghamshire and Oxfordshire Wildlife Trust. It is part of Cothill Fen, which is a Site of Special Scientific Interest and Special Area of Conservation.

Sandford Brook runs through this wet valley, which has limestone grassland, fen, woods, scrub, a pond and reedbeds. Reed buntings winter on the site, and other birds include water rail and reed warblers. There are common frogs and grass snakes.

References

Berkshire, Buckinghamshire and Oxfordshire Wildlife Trust